Drummer Keith Barber (17 April 1947 – 1 May 2005) was born in Kilburn, North West London, England, moved to Melbourne when he was 10 years old and later joined a local band, the Wild Cherries in early 1966. Together with founding member Les Gilbert, he put together a second incarnation of the group that recorded four singles for the Festival label between 1967 and 1968. In late 1968, he left to join a New Zealand band, The La De Das and travelled to England where the band recorded a cover of The Beatles "Come Together". He remained with the band throughout most of the Seventies but died on 1 May 2005.

People from Kilburn, London
1947 births
2005 deaths
English rock drummers
Wild Cherries members
British emigrants to Australia